American Soldier is the eleventh studio album by American progressive metal band Queensrÿche; it is a concept album released on March 31, 2009. The album debuted at No. 25 on the Billboard 200 chart. As its title suggests, American Soldier revolves around the lives and experiences of those who serve or have served in the United States armed forces.

Following the departure of Mike Stone, the album was the first to entirely be recorded by Queensrÿche as a quartet. It is also the first original album by the band where founding guitarist Michael Wilton does not receive a single writing credit.

Overview
The lyrical contents to the songs on American Soldier tell the story of war from a firsthand perspective. The album was produced by Jason Slater, who also produced and co-wrote Queensrÿche's 2006 album Operation: Mindcrime II, and was engineered by Kelly Gray, who was Queensrÿche's guitarist and producer from 1998–2001. It was recorded in 2008 over the course of nine months.

The album includes a particularly personal duet between Geoff Tate and his daughter Emily. The song, entitled "Home Again," focuses on a father returning home to his family after having been gone an extended period. This theme reflects both the life of Tate as a touring musician and the life of one who serves in the military.

Tate spent a few years interviewing veterans from all conflicts America has been involved in from World War II to the Iraq War, including his own father and collecting their stories in order to help him write the album.

Speaking about the inspiration for the album, Tate said:

Track listing

All songs written by Jason Slater and Geoff Tate except where noted.

Personnel
Band members
Geoff Tate - vocals, horns
Michael Wilton - lead guitar, acoustic guitar
Eddie Jackson - bass
Scott Rockenfield - drums

Additional performers
Emily Tate - vocals on track 11
Jason Ames - vocals on tracks 1 & 8
A.J. Fratto - vocals on track 1
Vincent Solano - vocals on track 5
Kelly Gray - rhythm guitar
Damon Johnson -  rhythm guitar
Randy Gane - keyboards

Production
Jason Slater - producer
Kelly Gray - producer, engineer, mixing
Susan Tate, Kenny Nemes - executive producers
Hugh Syme - art direction, design and illustrations

Charts

References

2009 albums
Concept albums
Queensrÿche albums
Atco Records albums
Albums produced by Jason Slater